{{Infobox writer 
| name          =  Katrina Porteous
| image             = 
| image_size    =  
| caption       =
| birth_date    =   
| birth_place   =    Aberdeen, Scotland
| death_place   =
| resting_place =
| occupation    = Poet  
| language      =
| nationality   =  
| residence     =    
| citizenship   = Scotland
| education     =   Trinity Hall, Cambridge
| alma_mater    =  
| period        =
| genre         =
| subject       = 
| movement      =
| notableworks  = 'Two Countries  
| spouse        = 
| partner       =
| awards        =  Eric Gregory Award
| signature     =
| signature_alt =
| portaldisp    =
}}

Katrina Porteous (born 1960 in Aberdeen) is a Scottish poet, historian and broadcaster. Her particular interests include the inshore fishing community of the Northumberland coast, and the cultural and natural history of that area.

Biography
Katrina Porteous  was born in Aberdeen, Scotland in 1960. She grew up in County Durham. She studied history at Cambridge, graduating in 1982. Afterwards, she studied in the USA on a Harkness Fellowship. In 1989 she won an Eric Gregory Award, and has since received awards from Arts Council England and the Arts Foundation.

Many of the poems in her first collection, The Lost Music (Bloodaxe Books, 1996), focus on the Northumbrian fishing community. Her prose books on the subject include The Bonny Fisher Lad (People’s History, 2003) and Limekilns and Lobster Pots (Jardine Press, 2013). She also writes in Northumbrian dialect, as in The Wund an’ the Wetter, recorded on CD with piper Chris Ormston (Iron Press, 1999). She is President of the Northumbrian Language Society, and an ambassador for New Networks for Nature.

Since 2000 she has specialised in radio poetry, much of it with BBC producer Julian May. Works include Longshore Drift, Dunstanburgh and The Refuge Box. Her second full-length collection from Bloodaxe Books, Two Countries (2014), includes some of these poems. She has been involved in many collaborations with other artists and musicians. In 2000 she worked with composer Alistair Anderson on the musical Tam Lin. Most recently she has collaborated with digital composer Peter Zinovieff on Horse (2011, about the 3,000-year-old Uffington White Horse), and Edge'' (2013, a poem in four moons for the Centre for Life planetarium, Newcastle). In August 2017 she collaborated with the composer and performer Alexis Bennett on "Sea, Sky, Stars" at Dartington International Festival.

References

External links
 Biographical note at Bloodaxe Books
 Katrina Porteous' website

Living people
1960 births
21st-century Scottish poets
Alumni of Trinity College, Cambridge
Scottish women poets
21st-century Scottish women writers
20th-century Scottish poets
20th-century Scottish women writers